Sivappu is a 2015 Tamil language film directed by Sathyasiva and produced by Muktha Films and 'Punnagai Poo' Gheetha. Evoking the plight of Sri Lankan Tamil refugees in India, the film stars Rajkiran, Naveen Chandra and Rupa Manjari, with music composed by N. R. Raghunanthan.

Cast 
Rajkiran as Konaar
Naveen Chandra as Pandian
Rupa Manjari as Parvathi
Thambi Ramiah
A. Venkatesh
Selva as Politician
Bose Venkat as Policeman
Poo Ram as Protester

Production
Following the release of Kazhugu, Sathyasiva immediately began work on his next venture in April 2012 starting Andhi Mazhai Megam, a story revolving around the lives of Sri Lankan refugees who work as construction workers in Tamil Nadu. The director then chose to rename the film as Sivappu (Red), revealing that the title also denotes themes of love, anger, poverty, violence and communism. Production began in August 2012, with Telugu actor Naveen Chandra and Rupa Manjari picked to play the lead pair. Sathyaraj, Selva, Thambi Ramiah were also reported to be seen in pivotal roles, while cinematography was announced to be handled by Madhu Ambat, editing by Kasi Viswanath and music by C. Sathya.

The film progressed throughout late 2012 and 2013 with Rajkiran roped in to replace Sathyaraj and Raghunandan taking over as the film's composer.

Reception 

The film opened to average reviews, with critics lauding the actors' performances along with Madhu Ambat's cinematography while complaining about the unconvincing blend of romance, comedy and drama.

Soundtrack
The soundtrack was composed by N. R. Raghunanthan.

References

External links
 

2015 films
2010s Tamil-language films
Films directed by Sathyasiva